The  is an incomplete national expressway in Hokkaido connecting Asahikawa, Hokkaidō and Monbetsu, Hokkaidō for a total length of 130 km. It is owned and operated by the Ministry of Land, Infrastructure, Transport and Tourism (MLIT). The route is signed E39 under MLIT's  "2016 Proposal for Realization of Expressway Numbering" and also as National Route 450.

History
In 2017, the Asahi-Monbetsu Expressway was the first expressway in Hokkaido to receive signage for the expressway numbering system.

References

National highways in Japan
Expressways in Japan
Roads in Hokkaido